Praslin Quarter was a former quarter  on the island nation of Saint Lucia.  Since at least 2001, it has been a second-order subdivision of the Micoud District. The 2001 and 2010 Census show Praslin as part of the Micoud District.  The population of Praslin is 341.

Places of interest
Other places of interest in the Praslin region are:
Old Settlement

Praslin Bay
Praslin Island
Praslin Estate.
 Rivière des Trois Islets stream,

History
An English explorer, Thomas Warner, sent Capt. Judlee with 300-400 Englishmen to establish a settlement at Praslin Bay but they were attacked over three weeks by Caribs, until the few remaining colonists fled on 12 October 1640.

See also
List of cities in Saint Lucia
Districts of Saint Lucia

References

Quarters of Saint Lucia
Subdivisions of Saint Lucia